The Utah Kid is a 1944 American Western film directed by Vernon Keays and starring Hoot Gibson and Bob Steele. It was made and distributed by the Poverty Row studio Monogram Pictures.

Cast
Hoot Gibson as Marshal Hoot Higgins
Bob Steele as Bob Roberts
Beatrice Gray as Marjorie Carter
Ralph Lewis as Cheyenne Kent
Evelyn Eaton as Dolores
Mauritz Hugo as Barton
George Morrell as Sheriff
Dan White as Henchman Slim
Mike Letz as Henchman Blackie
Jameson Shade as Judge Carter
Lynton Brent as Tells Bob He's Next (uncredited)
Jack Evans as Barfly (uncredited)
Al Ferguson as Bartender (uncredited)
Herman Hack as Henchman (uncredited)
Earle Hodgins as Rodeo Announcer (uncredited)
Lew Meehan as Bandit (uncredited)
Lew Morphy as Deputy (uncredited)
Fox O'Callahan as Deputy (uncredited)
Bud Osborne as Stage Driver Jim (uncredited)

External links

1944 films
American sports drama films
1940s English-language films
American black-and-white films
Monogram Pictures films
1944 Western (genre) films
American Western (genre) films
Films directed by Vernon Keays
1940s American films